Zumpt is a surname. Notable people with the surname include:

 Karl Gottlob Zumpt (1792–1894), German classical scholar
 August Wilhelm Zumpt (1815–1887), German classical scholar, nephew of Karl
 Fritz Konrad Ernst Zumpt (1908–1985), German entomologist